Artur Siarheyevich Litvinchuk (born 4 January 1988) is a Belarusian sprint canoeist who has competed since the late 2000s. He won the gold medal in the K-4 1000 m event at the 2008 Summer Olympics in Beijing.

Litvinchuck also won two medals in the K-4 1000 m event at the ICF Canoe Sprint World Championships with a gold in 2009 and a silver in 2010. He married Belarusian canoeist Maryna Pautaran.

References 
 Canoe09.ca profile
 

1988 births
Belarusian male canoeists
Canoeists at the 2008 Summer Olympics
Living people
Olympic canoeists of Belarus
Olympic gold medalists for Belarus
Olympic medalists in canoeing
ICF Canoe Sprint World Championships medalists in kayak
Medalists at the 2008 Summer Olympics
People from Mazyr
Sportspeople from Gomel Region